Harry Dudley Bromfield (26 June 1932 – 27 December 2020) was a South African cricketer who played in nine Test matches between 1961 and 1965.

A tail-end batsman and a right-arm off-break bowler, Bromfield succeeded Hugh Tayfield in the South African team but had limited success in Test matches. His best figures were 5 for 88 (off 57.2 overs) against England at Cape Town in 1964–65. He toured England in 1965, playing his last Test in the First Test at Lord's.

He played for Western Province from 1956–57 to 1965–66, then returned for one last match in 1968–69. His best figures were 7 for 60 against Transvaal in 1960–61. In 1962–63, also against Transvaal, he took 5 for 100 and 5 for 64, for match figures of 76.4–25–164–10. In his most successful season, 1960–61, he took 35 wickets at an average of 17.45.

References

External links
 

1932 births
2020 deaths
People from Mossel Bay
South African people of British descent
South Africa Test cricketers
South African cricketers
Western Province cricketers
International Cavaliers cricketers
Cricketers from the Western Cape